David James Lazar (born January 28, 1957) is United States-born rabbi-educator, and Rabbi at Or Hamidbar in Palm Springs, California. He has served
communities in Israel and Europe for more than 30 years.

Early life and times 
Raised in a committed liberal Conservative Movement family in Los Angeles, Lazar moved toward Orthodoxy in his teens. After completing his army service in 1980, he was one of the founders of Moshav Gan Or at Netzarim in the Gaza Strip. It is there that he met his wife Sascha Meijers - an immigrant to Israel from the Netherlands - and were married in the summer of 1981, and then moved to Jerusalem the year after.

Lazar was educated at Yeshivat Kerem B’Yavneh, where he  combined Jewish studies with service in the IDF's armor-corp. His BA in Bible Studies is from the Hebrew University and rabbinic ordination and MA in Jewish Studies (1993) are from the Schechter Institute. He was also a Jerusalem Fellow at the Mandel School for Educational Leadership (1998–2000).

Rabbinical career 
Before serving as rabbi at Or Hamidbar, Lazar served for more than two decades as a congregational rabbi and educator in Jerusalem, Tel Aviv, and Stockholm. In Jerusalem, Lazar served as Education Director at Kehilat Mevakshei Derech (at the time, independent) and was the Rabbi of Kehilat Ya’ar Ramot (Masorti/Conservative). He traversed the world of Orthodoxy and returned to his liberal Jewish roots, becoming a Conservative rabbi in 1993. He later moved to Tel Aviv, where he was the spiritual leader of Kehilat Tiferet Shalom (Masorti/Conservative). From 2010 to 2013, Lazar was rabbi of the Jewish Community of Stockholm, Sweden. Lazar served as rabbi and educator for Temple Isaiah (Moderate/Conservative) Jewish Community Center of Palm Springs, California until the end of 2018 at which time he formed "Or Hamidbar", an organization dedicated to developing spiritual Jewish identity in the Palm Springs Area.

Lazar has worked over the years in a wide variety of educational frameworks such as the TALI school system, Camp Ramah in California and Canada, as well as in the NOAM and Young Judea youth movements.
 
He is the founding director of RIKMA: Spiritual Community Leadership Development, which has accompanied many of the Masorti/Conservative and Mitkademet/Reform rabbis since 1999.

During his career, Lazar has been active in many non-profit organizations such as the Israel AIDS Task Force, the Jerusalem Open House, and the Rabbinical Assembly. While in Stockholm, and aside from fulfilling his regular duties leading the prayer services at the Great Synagogue, teaching, and counseling members of the community, Lazar was active in GLBTQ advocacy and interfaith dialogue.

Thanks to his unprecedented approach to such topics, production of a feature documentary film started in 2013. “The New Rabbi,” follows the work of Lazar at the Jewish Community of Stockholm. The film is produced and directed by Irene Lopez and Stefan Henriksson, and is expected to be released in 2017.

References
Press: "Music and Ministry: Rabbi David Lazar Leads the Jews Do the Blues Event to Raise Money for Or Hamidbar"
 

1957 births
American Orthodox rabbis
American Conservative rabbis
Living people
20th-century American rabbis
21st-century American rabbis